PANO1 is a protein which in humans is encoded by the PANO1 gene.  PANO1 is an apoptosis inducing protein that is able to regulate the function of tumor suppressor. More specifically, P14ARF is a protein in which in humans is modulated by the PANO1 gene.  P14ARF is known to function as a tumor suppressor. When PANO1 is highly expressed in the cells, it is able to modulate p14ARF by stabilizing it and protecting it from degradation.<ref name= With a confidence level of 5 out of 5, PANO1 has been theorized to be expressed in the nucleolus of the cell. PANO1 is an intron-less gene. Intron-less genes only make up about 3% of the human genome.   A functional analysis of these types of genes revealed that they often have tissue-specific expression in tissues such as the nervous system and testis.   This kind of expression is commonly associated with neuropathies, disease, and cancer.  The tissue types that PANO1 has the highest expression in, are the cerebellum regions of the brain as well as pituitary and testis tissues.

Gene 
PANO1 is also known as Proapoptotic Nucleolar Protein 1, PANO, and Pre-mRNA-splicing Factor CW22-like.  PANO1 is located on human chromosome 11 at positions 797,511-799,190 and is positioned on the + strand.  Its protein contains 1 exon and 215 amino acids.

Transcripts and proteins 

PANO1 has one isoform, isoform 1, located in the PONAB and PANTR species. These isoforms have proteins with 215 and 216 amino acids, respectively. No isoforms for the human PANO1 protein could be identified. Human PANO1 protein has a molecular weight of 22.8 kb and a theoretical, isoelectric point of 12.21. From an analysis of the PANO1 protein, it was observed that the protein contains a low amount of lysine and a very low amount of asparagine when compared to other human proteins.  The same analysis indicated that the protein does not contain any hydrophobic or transmembrane regions. PANO1 contains 2 cAMP phosphorylation sites, 6 N-myristoylation sites, 4 protein kinase C phosphorylation sites, 3 bipartite nuclear localization signals as well as arginine-rich and proline-rich regions. Using PSORTII, 3 discrimination of nuclear localization signals were identified. Pat4 (RRRR) at position 200, Pat7 (RRRR) at position 201 and a bipartite (RKGTPTARCLGQRTKEK) at position 35.  Nuclear localization signals allow proteins to be able to enter the nucleus, but many nuclear proteins possess their own. PANO1 overlaps solute carrier family 25 member 22 (SLC25A22). A causal  link between this solute carrier, when upregulated, has been strongly associated with an osteosarcoma's ability to proliferate. In addition to promoting proliferation, SLC25A22 when expressed in vitro, progressed the cell cycle and inhibited apoptosis. It is curious that PANO1, an apoptosis inducer, and SLC25A22, an apoptosis inhibiter, overlap one another.

Structure 
The structure of PANO1 is 82% disordered meaning the protein is able to move around easily.  The secondary structure reveals a beta strand at positions 3-9 as well as alpha helices incorporated throughout.

Gene level regulation

Promoter 
One promoter region was identified using Genomatix.  It is located on the positive strand and is 1040 bp in length.  Its start site is located at 795633 and it ends at 796672.  It overlaps with the primary transcript which starts at 796633. 440 transcription factors were identified within the promoter region.  To highlight some of relevance and importance to PANO1: Wilms tumor suppressor, spermatogenic zip 1 transcription factor, signal transducer and activator of transcription, pleomorphic adenoma gene, general transcription factor IIIA, stimulating protein 1, CCAAT/enhancer binding protein, GC box elements and HMG box-containing protein 1.

Expression 
Like previously mentioned, PANO1 is detected to be most expressed in the cerebellum, pituitary and testis tissues.  Furthermore, NCBI Geo profiles indicated that PANO1 is highly expressed in B-lymphocytes, liposarcomas, and the testis cell lines.  It also appears that PANO1 is highly expressed in the androgen-sensitive LAPC-4 cell line with a rank of 97.  PANO1 is biased to being expressed in androgen sensitive cells compared to androgen insensitive cells.

Transcript level regulation 

A predicted 3' UTR structure was generated using Unafold and depicts predicted stem loop structures.  Two stem loop structures are zoomed in on.

Protein level regulation 
A possible cleavage site was identified between amino acids 33 and 34 as depicted in the PANO1 protein model.  As mentioned previously,  6 N-myristoylation sites, 2 cAMP phosphorylation sites, and 4 protein kinase C phosphorylation sites are also present.

Homology and evolutionary history

Orthologs and phylogenic tree 

PANO1 orthologs were only able to be traced back in divergence to birds.  Much more closely related orthologs include primates, as well as marsupial and placental mammals.  Specific examples of orthologs can be seen in the table below.

Divergence 

PANO1 was compared to two other genes, fibrinogen alpha chain as well as cytochrome C.  The date of divergence as well as amino acid changes were tracked over many different species types to generate a divergence date vs. number of amino acids changes as seen to the right.  PANO1 appears to diverge much more quickly than fibrinogen alpha and much more quickly than cytochrome c.

Interacting proteins 
p14ARF is a protein that is a known tumor suppressor. It does this by controlling cell proliferation and cell survival, however the mechanism for how this process is controlled/modulated remained unclear. PANO1 has been identified to modulate and stabilize p14ARF by stabilizing it and protecting it from degradation in HeLa cells. When PANO1 is over-expressed, as a direct result, p14ARF expression also increases.

Clinical significance 
When there is an abnormal expression of PANO1 in HeLa cells, scientists have seen a decrease in tumorigenicity in nude mice.  Additionally, other diseases that have been associated with PANO1 include hemochromatosis 2.

References 

Genes on human chromosome 11